A hornwork is an element of the Italian bastion system of fortification.  Its face is flanked with a pair of demi-bastions.

It is distinguished from a crownwork, because crownworks contain full bastions at their centers. They are both outworks.

References

Fortifications